David John Shaw (20 July 1954 – 8 January 2005) was an Australian scuba diver, technical diver, and airline pilot for Cathay Pacific, flying the Lockheed L-1011 Tristar, then the 747-400, and then the A330-300, A340-300, and A340-600. He flew for Cathay Pacific from 1989 until his death in 2005. Before flying for Cathay Pacific he flew for Missionary Aviation Fellowship in Papua New Guinea and Tanzania. He also flew agricultural aircraft in South Australia and New South Wales.

Dive equipment 
Shaw's first rebreather was an Inspiration closed circuit rebreather, with which he eventually dived to depths beyond its purported capability. This prompted him to not only purchase a Mk15.5 but to replace its analogue electronics with the digital ones of the Juergensen Marine Hammerhead, resulting in a specially modified POD designed to handle extreme pressures. For extended dives in caves shallower than 150 m, Shaw used his Cis-Lunar since he believed it had superior redundancy capabilities but could not cope with extreme depths.

Diving records 
On 28 October 2004, Shaw descended to a depth of 270m at Bushman's Hole, South Africa, breaking the following records:
 Depth on a rebreather
 Depth in a cave on a rebreather
 Depth at altitude on a rebreather
 Depth running a line
He used a Mk15.5 with Juergensen Marine Hammerhead electronics and the following gas mixtures: trimix 4/80, 10/70, 15/55, 17/40, 26/25, air, nitrox50, 100% oxygen.

On this record-breaking dive, Shaw discovered the body of Deon Dreyer, a South African diver who had died in Bushman's Hole ten years previously.

Last dive 
Shaw died on 8 January 2005 while endeavoring to recover the body of Deon Dreyer.

Shaw recorded his dive with an underwater camera, which allowed researchers to determine that he suffered from respiratory issues due to the high pressure. Shaw ran into difficulties when the body unexpectedly began to float. Shaw had been advised by various experts that the body would remain negatively buoyant because the visible parts were reduced to the skeleton. However, within his drysuit, Dreyer's corpse had turned into a soap-like substance called adipocere, which floats. Shaw had been working with both hands, and so had been resting his can light on the cave floor. The powerful underwater lights that cave divers use are connected by wires to heavy battery canisters, normally worn on the cave diver's waist, or sometimes attached to their tanks. Normally he would have wrapped the wire behind his neck, but he was unable to do so; the lines from the body bag appear to have become entangled with the light head, and the physical effort of trying to free himself led to his death. Three days later, both of the bodies that had become entangled in the lines were pulled up to near the surface as the dive team was retrieving their equipment.

Shaw's close friend and support diver, Don Shirley, nearly died too and was left with permanent damage that has impaired his balance.

The dive on which Shaw died was the 333rd of his career.  At the time of his world record setting dive, he had been diving for a little over five years.

His death has been profiled in a number of documentary films, including the 2020 documentary feature Dave Not Coming Back.

Personal life 
Shaw was a devout Christian.  He and his wife, Ann, lived in Hong Kong, where they were members of a small Christian congregation.  They had two children, Steven Shaw and Lisa Shaw (now Lisa Moyers).

See also 
 Dave Not Coming Back

References 

 

1954 births
2005 deaths
Accidental deaths in South Africa
Australian aviators
Australian Christians
Australian underwater divers
Underwater diving deaths
Commercial aviators